Collin M. Hill (born October 9, 1997) is an American football quarterback for the Helvetic Guards of the European League of Football (ELF). He is a double transfer and played college football at Colorado State as well as South Carolina.

Early life and high school
Hill grew up in Moore, South Carolina and attended Dorman High School where he played basketball and football. He was named team captain and MVP as a senior in 2015, leading the Cavaliers to the South Carolina state championship game.

College career

Colorado State Rams
After high school, Hill committed to Colorado State University and the Rams football program. There he was starting quarterback but had three season ending injuries.

South Carolina Gamecocks
In 2020 he transferred to the University of South Carolina and being named starting quarterback instead of Ryan Hilinski.

Professional career

Cincinnati Bengals
Hill was undrafted and later signed as a free agent by the Cincinnati Bengals. He then was cut and didn't made the 55-man roster.

Helvetic Guards
On December 2, 2022, Hill was announced as starting quarterback of the newly founded franchise Helvetic Guards of the European League of Football.

Personal life
Hill owns a business degree from Colorado State University and is working on a Master’s in educational technology.

References

External links
 ESPN bio
 Colorado State Rams bio
 South Carolina Gamecocks bio

Living people
South Carolina Gamecocks football players
Players of American football from Georgia (U.S. state)
21st-century African-American sportspeople
1997 births
Cincinnati Bengals players
Helvetic Guards players
American expatriate players of American football
American expatriate sportspeople in Switzerland